Des Moines Menace is an American soccer team based in Des Moines, Iowa, United States. Founded in 1994, the team plays in USL League Two, the fourth tier of the American Soccer Pyramid. The Menace have had sustained success in USL League Two during their tenure, claiming the USL League Two Championship in the 2021 campaign. The Menace also hold three regular season championships, coming in the 2018, 2019, and 2021 campaigns respectively.   
The team aims to join USL Championship in 2024.

The team plays its home games at Valley Stadium in West Des Moines, Iowa. The team's colors are red, white and black.

History

The early years (1994–1999) 
Des Moines Menace began their competitive life as an expansion team in the old United States Interregional Soccer League (USISL), playing in the Midwest Division. They finished their first season in 1994 with a 5–13 record, in seventh place behind divisional champions Minnesota Thunder. They dropped down to the USISL Premier League in 1995, and finished third in the Central Division with a 10–8 record behind divisional champs and Iowa neighbors Sioux City Breeze, qualifying for the post-season playoffs in the process. They dispatched the Austin Lone Stars 3–2 in overtime in the divisional semi-final, and then overcame Sioux City 1–0 in the Divisional Final to progress to the national finals tournament. Menace lost the national semi final 3–1 to Florida outfit Cocoa Expos, and they then lost the third place playoff to San Francisco United All-Blacks, but it set the wheels in motion for one of American amateur soccer's most storied franchises; Aaron Leventhal led the attack, scoring 10 goals on the season, while goalkeeper Casey Mann posted an impressive 1.73 GAA rating.

The 1996 campaign was disappointing for Des Moines, finishing with a 7–7 record in the Southern Division, in 5th place behind Austin Lone Stars, and out of the playoffs in the first round following a 1–0 defeat to the Lone Stars. The USISL Premier League became the PDSL in 1997, and again Des Moines finished the Central Division campaign in 4th place behind Nebraskan champs Lincoln Brigade with a 6–1–9 record. The playoffs were slightly more successful, as they surprisingly dispatched Lincoln 4–0 in the divisional semi finals, and overcame the Omaha Flames 6–0 in the divisional finals, before falling to 3–0 to the Mid-Michigan Bucks in the national quarter finals.

1998 saw an improvement in regular season play from the Iowans, as they finished second in the Central Division behind the Colorado Comets with a 9–4–3 record, and qualified for the post-season for the fourth consecutive time. They beat Twin Cities Tornado 1–0 in overtime in the divisional semi-finals, and then dispatched Kansas City Brass on penalty kicks in the divisional final to reach the national tournament once more; Menace again faced Cocoa Expos in the regional round, but this time emerged from the encounter 3–1 winners, and were now just 90 minutes from the championship game. Des Moines' opponents were the on form San Gabriel Valley Highlanders from Glendale, California, who won 3–1 and went on to take the title, while Menace were left to console themselves with a 4–1 win over Kalamazoo Kingdom in the 3rd/4th place playoff.

The PDSL became the PDL in 1999, but Des Moines were unable to capitalize on their playoff run from the previous year; they ended the season fourth in the Heartland Division behind Twin Cities Tornado, and with the change in the playoff qualification system missed the post-season for the first time in five seasons. The Menace missed the playoffs again in 2000, finishing the season with a 10–0–8 record, just one point behind the Rockford Raptors. The PDL qualification rules were changed again prior to the 2001 season which meant that, despite Menace finishing second to Sioux Falls Spitfire in the Heartland Division, they made it all the way to the national semi-finals, before eventually falling 5–1 to eventual national champions Westchester Flames.

2000s Success (2000–2003) 
2002 was a banner year for Des Moines, who enjoyed a tremendous regular season, remaining unbeaten the entire season, and topping the Heartland Division by a clear 20 points from their closest rivals, Boulder Rapids Reserve, and in the process winning the first silverware in franchise history. Their excellent form also took the Menace to the US Open Cup for first time in franchise history. They beat the D3 Pro League side New Jersey Stallions 3–1 in the First Round, before losing 3–2 to A-League stalwarts Rochester Raging Rhinos on a Lenin Steenkamp golden goal. However, their overwhelming success in the regular season eventually meant nothing as they shockingly lost to the Mid-Michigan Bucks in the Central Conference Semifinals; despite the early exit, Menace's Czech striker Tomas Boltnar was awarded the PDL MVP award, the PDL Rookie of the Year awards, and was the league's top scorer with 24 goals, while head coach Laurie Calloway was named Coach of the Year.

Calloway left his manager's post in the 2002–03 offseason to become head coach of the Syracuse Salty Dogs in the A-League, and he was replaced by Greg Petersen. Petersen's season in charge was a generally good one; Menace got off to a flying start, rattling off six wins on the trot at the beginning of the year, including a 7–0 demolition of Wisconsin Rebels and a 4–1 thrashing of St. Louis Strikers. Once again, Menace's excellent early form took them to the US Open Cup for the second consecutive season, although their campaign was a short one as they fell 2–1 at home to Milwaukee-based USASA side Bavarian SC. Menace stuttered a little in June, losing both their matchups against Boulder Rapids Reserve, but still putting 10 goals past Sioux Falls Spitfire in their two meetings, with Boltnar scoring four. The goalscoring highlight of the year was the astonishing 8–2 win over Kansas City Brass at home in early July in which Joseph Kabwe scored five goals, and Boltnar scored a hat trick. Des Moines coasted down the home stretch, winning two of their last four games, eventually finishing in second place in the Heartland Division behind Chicago Fire Premier. Des Moines' trip to the post-season was a short one, as they fell to Great Lakes champions Mid-Michigan Bucks in the Conference Semifinals. Boltnar was named PDL MVP for the second consecutive year, and again was Menace's top scorer with 14 goals, while Boltnar and Joseph Kabwe registered 10 assists apiece.

Coaching rotations and Heartland success (2004–2006) 
Despite the team's success, head coach Petersen was replaced by Marc Grune prior to the 2004 season; under his tenure the team suffered slightly, as league expansion in the Midwest took its toll. Menace were inconsistent in the first part of the year, winning three and losing three of their opening six games. They put five past the Wisconsin Rebels and Sioux Falls Spitfire, but uncharacteristically conceded three at home to the St. Louis Strikers. The month of June was magnificent for Menace, as they enjoyed a seven-game winning streak that featured a two six-goal hammerings of Wisconsin Rebels and Indiana Blast. Everything looked to be on course for another trip to the post season, but Menace inexplicably fell apart during the run-in, losing three of their final five games, including a devastating 5–4 loss to Thunder Bay Chill in which the Canadians scored a last-minute winner having been down 4–3 with 20 minutes to go. The end of season stutter cost Des Moines dearly, as they eventually finished the year third in the Heartland Division behind Chicago Fire Premier and out of the playoffs. Boltnar was Menace's top scorer, with 9 goals, while Edwin Disang contributed 7 assists.

Grune paid for his failure with his job, as Menace hired former standout goalkeeper Casey Mann as their new head coach. Mann's impact on the Menace was felt almost immediately; they started the season six wins in seven games, including a 5–1 hammering of Kansas City Brass, a 3–0 win on the road over Colorado Springs Blizzard, and a 3–0 victory at home over their increasingly bitter rivals Thunder Bay Chill. Once again, Des Moines' excellent early form took them to the US Open Cup, and on their first cup run: they beat USL Second Division side Pittsburgh Riverhounds on penalties in the first round, USL First Division side Charleston Battery 3–2 in the second round, and absolutely destroyed USL First Division's Atlanta Silverbacks 5–1 in a game which saw Michael Kraus hit a brace. Menace played their first ever competitive match against a Major League Soccer team in the fourth round, away at the Kansas City Wizards, and although the fairytale was ended by a comprehensive 6–1 defeat, it was testament to Des Moines' increasingly high standard of play that they got as far as they did. Back in PDL league play, and despite a couple of mid-season losses, both to Thunder Bay, Des Moines continued to provide value for money and goalscoring prowess as the season reached its conclusion: they hit Sioux Falls Spitfire for ten in their two games in early July, with Boltnar and Disangagain doing the damage, and coasted into the playoffs off the back of a 5–0 final day demolition of nine-man Colorado Springs Blizzard, with another two goals from Disang. The Menace faced Great Lakes Division winners Chicago Fire Premier in the Central Conference Semifinals, and walked away with a resounding 4–0 victory; they then took the Conference title with ease, outplaying the Michigan Bucks to the tune of a comprehensive 4–1 scoreline. Menace moved on to the national stage for the first time since 2001, and beat Western Conference champions Orange County Blue Star 2–1 to reach the 2005 PDL Championship game. Their opponents were Southern Conference champions El Paso Patriots and, after a tight 0–0 in regulation time, Des Moines triumphed 6–5 on penalty kicks to take their first PDL title, with Andy Gruenebaum making two vital saves, and Luke Frieberg converting the winning spot kick. Boltnar was Menace's top player on all parts of the pitch for the third straight year, with 10 goals and 10 assists.

Des Moines began 2006 looking to defend their PDL title, and began the season in the best possible way, rattling off six wins in their first seven games, including a trio of impressive home wins, 3–0 over Colorado Springs Blizzard, 5–1 over Sioux Falls Spitfire and 4–1 over Thunder Bay Chill, the latter of which featured a brace from Armin Mujdzic. Menace enjoyed their fourth US Open Cup campaign off the back of their early form, and for the second year in a row they proved to be formidable opponents for higher league opposition. They beat the Milwaukee-based USASA team Croatian Eagles 4–1 in the qualifying round, and a second amateur team – Dallas Mustang Legends – in the first round proper, before causing a huge upset by knocking out USL First Division powerhouse Minnesota Thunder in the second round 1–0, with the winning goal being scored by Boltnar. In the third round, Menace faced off against the Wizards in the third round second consecutive season; this year, they would hang in the match until Scott Sealy won it in stoppage time. The mid-season saw a slight stutter from Des Moines as they lost three of their next four games, including a pair of demoralizing losses to Boulder Rapids Reserve which would eventually decide the divisional title. Menace did bounce back down the home stretch, remaining unbeaten in their final five regular season games, but the results included two ties against the St. Louis Lions, which left the Rapids ten points clear of Menace at the top of the Heartland Division standings. Menace faced Great Lakes division champions Chicago Fire Premier in the Central Conference Semifinal; the game was an epic one, with Menace hanging on for a 1–1 tie at the end of regular time despite being a man short following a red card. Extra time saw the Menace fight back from two goals down to force penalty kicks after a 3–3 tie; however, the Menace lost the penalty shootout 5–3, ending their title defense. Once more, Boltnar and Disang led the scoring tables with 7 goals each.

Post title struggles and resurgence (2007–2009) 
2007 did not go the way of The Red Army, as the Iowans missed the playoffs for just the second time in seven seasons. Everything started brightly for Des Moines with a 5–0 opening day victory of Sioux Falls Spitfire, but fell apart quickly, as Menace slumped to an unprecedented three consecutive losses in their next three games. Unusually, it was Des Moines' road form which proved to be their downfall: they suffered unexpected defeats to St. Louis Lions and Thunder Bay Chill, including a 4–0 battering at the hands of the latter in the penultimate game of the season. Menace's home form continued to be impressive, and they enjoyed several high-scoring victories in front of their fans, including a 5–1 thrashing of Kansas City Brass, and an easy 8–0 flattening of the torrid Springfield Demize in which Tucker Sindlinger and Nicki Paterson scored two goals each. However, the lack of consistency in Des Moines' play left them a distant fourth in the table, eight points behind divisional champions Thunder Bay. For the sixth straight year Boltnar was the team's joint top scorer, sharing the honors with Nicki Paterson with 9 goals each.

Des Moines began 2008 sluggishly; they won just two of their opening six games (although one of those was a 7–0 hammering of Springfield Demize) and were left playing catch-up behind Colorado Rapids U23's and Thunder Bay Chill for the remainder of the season. The Menace won three games in June, including a hugely satisfying 3–1 on the road in Thunder Bay, but suffered two unexpected home losses to their closest rivals before enjoying their second win over Thunder Bay, a comprehensive 5–1 home victory in front of 3,217 delirious fans. In a very tight run-in, Des Moines beat Springfield Demize 2–0 on the road, but then were made to endure two ties in their final two regular season games, which meant their playoff fate was out of their hands. Their third-place finish meant that the Great Lakes Division game between Michigan Bucks and Toronto Lynx would determine the final standings; Michigan won the game, and in doing so finished with the best record in the Central Conference, which meant Toronto got in as the lucky third placed team, and Des Moines missed out in the closest of circumstances. For the first time in seven years Boltnar was not Menace's top scorer – that honor went to Nicki Paterson with 6 goals, although the 29-year-old Czech player did tally 5 assists.

2009 would see the retirement of the legendary Boltnar, the announcement of the end of the Mann era, and the first divisional title for the Menace since 2002. The Menace would open with three consecutive wins before drawing three consecutive matches where they would concede late goals for the draw. A draw and win at defending PDL champion Thunder Bay put Des Moines well in control of the Heartland Division, and the Menace would run their unbeaten streak to 15 matches dating over a year before finally falling at home to Thunder Bay. The Menace would finish the regular season 11–1–4. A 2–1 victory over Real Colorado would send Des Moines to the quarterfinals, where they would fall at home, 1–0, to Cary. The 2009 squad featured a balanced attack where eighteen different players scored over the course of sixteen league matches, with no player tallying more than  Armin Mujdzic's five.

2010s and USL (2010–2019) 
The 2010 season started off seemingly like a potential title repeat with the Menace racing to a 4–1–0 start and qualifying for the Open Cup for the first time in four years. However, four straight league ties broke up the team's momentum. The Menace then stepped away from PDL play to host 2nd division AC St. Louis in first round play of the Open Cup, where they suffered a heartbreaking 1–0 loss. A 7–2 shellacking at arch-rival Thunder Bay was followed by two more draws. Despite a pair of dominating shutouts (6–0 against Springfield and 3–0 against the Brass), a 3–1 loss to the Chill all but knocked the Menace from playoff contention. The season ended on a fitting note: after rallying to take a 2–1 lead on the Lions, the Menace conceded late for their 7th draw of the year. Despite losing just three matches all season, seven draws in sixteen matches left them eight points out of playoff qualification in fourth. Captain Clark Bradford and defender Logan McDaniel shared the scoring lead with five goals each.

The 2011 season saw the Menace finish unbeaten in the regular season (12–0–4). In a tight playoff race (the top three clubs finished twenty points clear of the fourth-place team), the Menace edged out Real Colorado on head-to-head. However, in the playoffs, they would concede a late goal to force extra time against the Michigan Bucks and lose, 3–2, in extra time.

In 2012, once again they engaged in a close battle with Colorado for the second playoff spot behind Thunder Bay. A dramatic late victory against the Chill would keep the Menace's hopes alive, but they fell one point short of the Foxes for the final spot. After the season, it was announced that Calloway would be parting ways with the club again.

The 2013 season—the 20th season of Menace Soccer—was highlighted by a run to the third round of the U.S. Open Cup. On May 28, the Menace visited Sporting Park, losing against Sporting Kansas City in a 2–0 match played in front of more than 15,000 fans. This showdown with a Major League Soccer team was made possible by the Menace's 1–0 upset at Minnesota United FC one week earlier. Captain Brandon Fricke headed in the match's only goal on May 21, and the Menace held on to knock off the North American Soccer League side.

The Menace entered the 2013 season under the direction of a new head coach, Mike Jeffries, and a new general manager, Matt Homonoff. The season of highs and lows ended with a 6–6–2 regular-season record—the team's first nonwinning record since 1999. For the second-straight year, the team missed the PDL playoffs.

In 2014, the Menace's 12–1–1 record was the best in the PDL and they won the Heartland Division title. They lost the Central Conference Final to the eventual PDL Champion Michigan Bucks 2–0. Mike Jeffries was named PDL Coach of the Year and Forward Chris Hellmann was named to the All-League team.

Mike Jeffries left to become head coach of the Charlotte Independence, a USL Pro expansion team. Original Chicago Fire Premier head coach Mike Matkovich was hired as head coach on February 5, 2015.

On January 5, 2017, John Pascarella, formerly goalkeeper coach for Sporting Kansas City, was named head coach.

In April 2019, Mark McKeever was announced as new head coach of the Menace, replacing departing Alen Marcina. The Menace were also part of the rebranding of the former PDL into USL League Two.

COVID-19 and Champions (2020-Present) 
Following a cancelled 2020 USL League Two season, the Menace embarked on what would be a historic 2021 season. Winning their first nine consecutive games, the Menace spent most of the season on top of the league rankings. Falling just once at an away game in Chicago, the Menace finished the season 11-1-0 as both Heartland Division Champions and USL2 Regular Season Champions. The Menace entered the playoffs as the No. 1 overall seed, and dominated Texas United 5–0, followed by a tense 1–0 victory over Flint City to qualify for the Central Conference Final. Sticking to their winning ways, the Menace triumphed over Kalamazoo FC 2–1 to claim the Central Conference Title. Just two days later, the Menace faced Portland Timbers U23 in the National Semifinal and emerged with a 2–0 victory. In the final playoff match of the 2021 season, the Menace put one goal past NC Fusion U23, which was enough to secure their second league title. Each of their playoff matches were hosted at Valley Stadium in West Des Moines, with the league final breaking both a club and league attendance record with 7,342 fans in attendance. Manel Busquets was named MVP of the match.

In 2022, the team once again made a run in the playoffs after completing an undefeated regular season under first year Head Coach Dean Johnson. However, the team ultimately fell to Flint City in the Elite 8 round in penalty kicks.

USL Pro Iowa 
On September 18, 2019, Menace owner Kyle Krause announced plans to bring a USL Championship team to Des Moines, pending construction of a downtown stadium. Said USL President Jake Edwards, “There is very strong local ownership and a huge appetite for professional soccer. All that’s remaining now is the development of a soccer-specific stadium, and once that occurs, we look forward to delivering a professional soccer club that this community can be proud of.” On January 27, 2022, USL officially awarded Des Moines a USL Championship expansion club, set to play its inaugural season in 2024.

Players

Notable former players
This list of notable former players comprises players who went on to play professional soccer after playing for the team in the Premier Development League, USL2, or those who previously played professionally before joining the team.

Tomas Boltnar, a two-time (2002, 2003) PDL MVP from the Czech Republic, is the club's all-time leading goalscorer, with 73 goals. He retired from competitive play prior to the 2009 season. Boltnar never played fully professional soccer at any level, and now works as a cost analyst for Kum & Go, as well as coaching Menace Academy boys teams.

Team record: year-by-year

(*) competing as Iowa Menace

Honors

Premier Development League / USL League Two
 League Champions (2): 2005, 2021
 Regular Season Champions (5): 2002, 2014, 2018, 2019, 2021
 Central Conference Champions (2): 2005, 2021
 Division Champions (11)
 Central Division Champions (2): 1995, 1998
 Heartland Division Champions (8): 2002, 2009, 2014, 2015, 2016, 2018, 2019, 2021
 Deep North Division Champions (1): 2022
 PDL Organization of the Year (1): 2009

Head coaches
  Blair Reid (1994)
  Blair Reid and Doug Mello (1995)
  Blair Reid (1996–1997)
  Al Driscoll (1998–2000)
  Laurie Calloway (2001–2002)
  Greg Petersen (2003)
  Marc Grune (2004)
  Casey Mann (2005–2009)
  Laurie Calloway (2010–2012)
  Mike Jeffries (2013–2014)
  Mike Matkovich (2015–2016)
  John Pascarella (2017)
  Alen Marcina (2018)
  Mark McKeever (2019–2021)
  Dean Johnson (2022-)

Stadiums
 Stadium at Dowling Catholic High School; West Des Moines, Iowa (1994)
 Cara McGrane Memorial Stadium; Des Moines, Iowa (1995–2004)
 Waukee Stadium; Waukee, Iowa (2005–2007)
 Valley Stadium; West Des Moines, Iowa (2008–2018, 2021–present)
 Drake Stadium; Des Moines, Iowa (2019)

In their early days, the Menace played their home matches on the soccer fields of Dowling Catholic High School in West Des Moines, with very limited bleachers and no lights. To meet league stadium requirements, the Menace moved to Cara McGrane Memorial Stadium, located on the campus of Herbert Hoover High School on the west side of Des Moines. With bleachers and lights at their new home, the Menace were able to push games to evenings instead of summer afternoons.

Attendance skyrocketed at McGrane Stadium. After averaging a mere 67 fans in their inaugural season and between 234 and 341 from 1995 to 1997, attendance passed 2,000 in 2001 and hit a record 4,415 fans/match in the final season at McGrane, 2004.

Buoyed by the increasing attendance averages (far and away the league leaders), the Menace began making plans to build a soccer-specific stadium. The proposed Liberty Bank Stadium would have been a 6,000 seater capable of hosting team, youth, and international matches. However, a land negotiation with western suburb Urbandale broke down and the Menace were unable to find another interested party.

With plans for a new stadium collapsing, the Menace moved to Waukee Stadium in nearby Waukee for the 2005 season, where they remained through 2007. Attendance was in the high 3000s to low 4000s at Waukee Stadium. The Menace also played home matches at Coach Cownie Stadium on the south side of Des Moines when Waukee Stadium had conflicts in the preseason.

For the 2008 season, Menace relocated to Valley Stadium in nearby West Des Moines.

The Menace moved to historic Drake Stadium for the 2019 season. This was the first time the team played in Des Moines proper since 2004.

Starting in 2021, the Menace returned to Valley Stadium in West Des Moines after playing one season at Drake Stadium.

References

External links

Des Moines Menace at USL League Two

Association football clubs established in 1994
USL League Two teams
Sports in Des Moines, Iowa
Soccer clubs in Iowa
1994 establishments in Iowa